Arotromima is a genus of moth in the family Gelechiidae. It contains the species Arotromima politica, which is found in Guyana.

The wingspan is about 14 mm. The forewings are white, tinged grey on the posterior third, darker near the apex and with the costal edge blackish at the base, some slight brownish suffusion beneath this. There is some brown suffusion along the posterior half of the costa and the stigmata are indicated by faint greyish suffusion. There are three small black marginal marks around the apex. The hindwings are pale grey.

References

Gelechiinae
Taxa named by Edward Meyrick
Monotypic moth genera
Moths of South America